Pedro Rodrigues (born 8 July 1971) is a retired Portuguese athlete who specialized in the 400 metres hurdles.

Career
Born in Lisbon, Rodrigues represented S.L. Benfica at club level. He finished fourth at the 1994 European Championships in Athletics. He also competed at the 1991 World Championships, the 1992 Olympic Games, the 1993 World Championships, the 1999 World Championships, the 2000 Olympic Games and the 2002 European Championships without reaching the final.

Rodrigues' personal best time was 48.77 seconds, achieved at the 1994 European Championships in Helsinki.

References

1971 births
Living people
Athletes from Lisbon
Portuguese male hurdlers
Athletes (track and field) at the 1992 Summer Olympics
Athletes (track and field) at the 2000 Summer Olympics
Olympic athletes of Portugal
S.L. Benfica athletes